The Art of Rebellion is the sixth studio album by American crossover thrash band Suicidal Tendencies, released in 1992 on Epic Records. It was the only Suicidal Tendencies album to be recorded without an official drummer; the drum tracks were handled by Josh Freese, filling in for the departed R.J. Herrera. The Art of Rebellion maintains its position as the band's most commercially successful studio album to date, and the songs "Nobody Hears" and "I'll Hate You Better" have the distinction of being the only top 40 hits (radio or otherwise) in Suicidal Tendencies' career.

Album information
Released in the wake of the success of grunge and alternative rock, The Art of Rebellion is widely considered to be Suicidal's "experimental" album. Mike Clark has acknowledged this, but also mentioned that the album was not planned that way, and was just a reflection of the band's musical growth. The songs show the band's continuing experimentation that had begun on its predecessor, Lights...Camera...Revolution!, as well as more progressive song structures, a somewhat more alternative atmosphere, and even pop-oriented sounds. This helped the band not only outride the explosion of alternative in the early 1990s, it also helped them gain a fan base within that community. Nonetheless, the album still stays true to the band's thrash and punk roots on many of the songs.

At almost 60 minutes long, The Art of Rebellion was Suicidal Tendencies' longest album to date, until 2013's 13. Singles to promote the album were "Nobody Hears", "Asleep at the Wheel", and "I'll Hate You Better"; the music videos for each single gained substantial airplay by Headbangers Ball on MTV.

Longtime drummer R.J. Herrera left Suicidal Tendencies just prior to the album's recording sessions, and instead of replacing him, the remaining members opted to record as a four-piece and were joined by Josh Freese of The Vandals, who is credited as a session drummer on the album and does not appear in any of the photos on the insert. For the accompanying tour for The Art of Rebellion, Herrera was replaced by former Y&T and White Lion drummer Jimmy DeGrasso, who would stay in Suicidal Tendencies until the band's initial breakup in 1995.

Reception

The Art of Rebellion peaked at number 52 on the Billboard 200.

Track listing

Credits
Suicidal Tendencies
Mike Muir – vocals
Rocky George – lead guitar
Mike Clark – rhythm guitar
Robert Trujillo – bass

Additional musicians
Josh Freese – drums
John Webster – keyboards
Dennis Karmazyn – cello

Chart positions

References

Suicidal Tendencies albums
1992 albums
Epic Records albums
Albums produced by Peter Collins (record producer)